Viktor Foerster (26 August 1867 - 9 December 1915) was a Czech painter and mosaic artist. He was the son of the composer Josef Foerster and younger brother of the composer Josef Bohuslav Foerster.

One of his major works was a large mosaic of the Virgin Mary, which is located in the pilgrimage church in Hostýn at the main temple entrance.

See also
List of Czech painters

References

1867 births
1915 deaths
19th-century Czech painters
Czech male painters
20th-century Czech painters
19th-century Czech male artists
20th-century Czech male artists